Astragalus cavanillesii is a species of legume in the family Fabaceae.
It is found only in Spain.
Its natural habitat is Mediterranean-type shrubby vegetation.
It is threatened by habitat loss.

References

cavanillesii
Endemic flora of Spain
Endemic flora of the Iberian Peninsula
Matorral shrubland
Critically endangered plants
Critically endangered biota of Europe
Taxonomy articles created by Polbot